Post Oak Township is an inactive township in Johnson County, in the U.S. state of Missouri.

Post Oak Township was established in 1849, taking its name from Post Oak Creek.

References

Townships in Missouri
Townships in Johnson County, Missouri